The 2004 AFC Youth Championship was the 33rd instance of the AFC Youth Championship. It was held from 25 September to 9 October 2004 in Malaysia. The tournament was won by for the eleventh time by South Korea in the final against China PR.

Qualification

Squads

Group stage

Group A

Group B

Group C

Group D

Knockout stage

Quarterfinals

Semifinals

Third place playoff

Final

Winners

Goalscorers

Countries to participate in 2005 FIFA World Youth Championship 
 
 
 
 

 
2004
Youth
AFC Youth
2004
2004 in youth association football
Sport in Kuala Lumpur